NickMusic is an Australian TV channel jointly owned by Foxtel Networks and Paramount Networks UK & Australia. It launched on 1 July 2020 replacing Channel [V] on channel 802, taking the slot of [V]'s 2-hour timeshift. It is an Australian version of the U.S pay television channel of the same name, a kid-safe, family-friendly music video channel for 4-15 year olds mainly featuring modern-day pop and teen pop hits on an automated schedule. It is the first NickMusic channel in Oceania and the second to launch outside of the United States (after the Dutch version).

On 6 July 2020, NickMusic was made available in New Zealand via satellite TV broadcaster Sky. In April 2021, it was added onto Fetch TV.

Unlike its sister MTV-branded music channels, NickMusic is not programmed locally and is instead a direct (non-timeshifted) simulcast of the Dutch version, giving Dutch artists some form of exposure in Australia.

References

External links

Foxtel
Australia and New Zealand
Television channels and stations established in 2020
English-language television stations in Australia
Children's television channels in Australia
Music video networks in Australia
Television channels in New Zealand
2020 establishments in Australia